Route 251 is a north/south highway on the south shore of the St. Lawrence River. Its northern terminus is at Route 108 in Cookshire-Eaton, and its southern terminus is at Route 141, in Saint-Herménégilde.

Municipalities along Route 251
 Saint-Herménégilde
 Sainte-Edwidge-de-Clifton
 Martinville
 Cookshire-Eaton

See also
 List of Quebec provincial highways

References

External links 
 Route 251 on Google Maps
 Provincial Route Map (Courtesy of the Quebec Ministry of Transportation) 

251